Gideon is an unincorporated community and census-designated place (CDP) in Cherokee County, Oklahoma, United States. The population was 49 at the 2010 census.

Geography
Gideon is located northwest of the center of Cherokee County along Oklahoma State Highway 82.

Demographics

References

Census-designated places in Cherokee County, Oklahoma
Census-designated places in Oklahoma